(Spanish for "Let’s go Chile”) is a centre-right to right-wing political coalition of three political parties in Chile. The coalition was created on 29 January 2015 by the general secretaries of the Independent Democrat Union (UDI), National Renewal (RN), Democratic Independent Regionalist Party (PRI) and Political Evolution (Evópoli).

For the 2021 parliamentary election, the coalition was renamed  (stylized , Spanish for "Chile we can (do) more").

History
On August 2, 2014, during the National Council of National Renewal in Santiago, the party chairman Cristián Monckeberg called his group together with the UDI and then political movement Evópoli to refound the Alliance under the name Coalition for Freedom. Negotiations were also held with the Independent Regionalist Party so that it would join the coalition, which concluded in December 2014 with the creation of a new coalition agreed to contest the municipal elections of 2016, and the presidential, parliamentary and regional councilors elections of 2017.

The new coalition was made official on January 29, 2015, and the process of finding a name for the new referent began.

In August 2015, the four member parties agreed to submit two lists for the election of councilors in 2016: one consisting of RN and UDI, and the other composed of the PRI and Evópoli. The same month, the name "" ("Let's get up") emerged as the name that generated greater consensus within the coalition as its mark. However, the name was challenged by the NGO , which objected to similarities with its own name and logo. The opposition bloc responded that the name of the coalition was not yet formalized and that "" was only one of the options to consider. The name "" was decided on 4 October 2015.

Following the election of Sebastián Sichel as the coalition's candidate during the 2021 presidential primaries,  has been considering changing the name of the coalition, with most suggestions revolving around Sichel's campaign slogan "" (It is possible). On August 20, 2021, the name of the coalition was officially changed to "" ("Chile can do more").

Frictions 

In late 2019, UDI froze for a few months their membership with the coalition because of major disagreements with some policies of their fellow parties.

For the 2021 Constitutional Convention election,  and the Republican Party agreed to participate in a joint list called  (Spanish for "Let's go for Chile") as a way to ensure the combined list could secure the third of seats needed in the Constitutional Convention to veto proposals to be included in the new Constitution of Chile.

The single list, however, had the worst electoral result for any right-wing alliance since the reestablishment of democracy in Chile.  got 20% of the votes and only 37 of the 155 seats in the Convention.

Composition

Political council 
The coalition has a political council with 47 members: 16 independents, 10 from National Renewal, 10 from the Independent Democratic Union, 6 from Political Evolution and 5 from the Independent Regionalist Party.

 Independent Democratic Union:
 Guillermo Ramírez
 María José Hoffmann
 Juan Antonio Coloma
 Patricio Melero
 Jaime Bellolio
 Edmundo Eluchans
 Jorge Castro
 Francisco de la Maza
 Andrés Chadwick
 Political Evolution:
 Jorge Saint-Jean
 Andrés Molina
 Lorena Recabarren
 Felipe Morandé
 Pedro Pablo Errázuriz
 Luciano Cruz-Coke

 National Renewal:
 Mario Desbordes
 Andrés Allamand
 Alberto Espina
 Manuel José Ossandón
 Carlos Larraín
 Nicolás Monckeberg
 Francisco Chahuán
 Felipe Guevara
 José Miguel Arellano
 Sergio Romero Pizarro
 Democratic Independent Regionalist Party:
 Eduardo Salas
 Hugo Ortiz de Filippi
 Yuri Olivares
 Mario González Rubio
 Alejandro Fuentes

 Independents:
 Sebastián Piñera
 Soledad Arellano
 Rosanna Costa
 Karin Ebensperger
 Ximena Rivas
 Vicente Alti
 Hugo Herrera
 Julio Isamit
 Sebastián Keitel
 Felipe Larraín
 Nicolás León
 Carlos Llancaqueo
 Pablo Ortúzar
 Ricardo Sande
 José Villagrán
 Rosita Díaz

See also 

 List of political parties in Chile
 New Majority (Chile)
 2017 Chilean general election

References

External links 
 Unión Demócrata Independiente (Independent Democratic Union)
 Renovación Nacional (National Renewal)
 Partido Regionalista Independiente Demócrata (Democratic Independent Regionalist Party)
 Evolución Política (Political Evolution)

Political parties established in 2015
Political party alliances in Chile
Conservatism in Chile
2015 establishments in Chile